The Waterguard was a division of HM Customs and Excise (HMCE) responsible for the control of vessels, aircraft,  vehicles and persons arriving into and departing from the United Kingdom. This included crew members and passengers, as well as persons travelling on foot. Waterguard officers were responsible for applying the allowances provided for in law and for collection of customs and excise revenue on the excess. The officers were also responsible for the enforcement of the prohibitions and restrictions, including controlled drugs and plant and animal health. With the reorganization of HM Customs and Excise in 1972 the Waterguard was renamed the 'Preventive Service' and the functions of the Waterguard continued to be carried out as part of the HMCE (and its successor HM Revenue and Customs) until the establishment of the UK Border Agency in 2008.

History
Formed in 1809 as the "Preventive Waterguard" (also known as the Preventive Boat Service) to combat smuggling, the Waterguard was an independent arm of revenue enforcement and complemented the "riding officers" (stationed along the south coast of England) who patrolled the shore on horseback, and the offshore revenue cutters (which were owned and operated by both the Board of Customs and the Board of Excise). The Waterguard was initially based in watch houses around the coast, and boat crews patrolled inshore waters around the coast in small boats each night.  It was placed under Admiralty  control from 1816 to 1822, when it and the riding officers and cutters were amalgamated under the control of HM Customs and renamed the Coast Guard (itself placed under Admiralty control in 1856). With the Coast Guard having moved away from preventive work in the years that followed, the Waterguard was re-formed as part of HM Customs in 1891 and absorbed into the Customs and Excise department in 1909.

The name "Waterguard" became misleading after 1923, when their domain was extended to the border between Northern Ireland and the Irish Free State (now the Republic of Ireland), and they also came to carry out controls at airports and other places of entry into the United Kingdom. Waterguard officers were often referred to simply as "customs officers", although until 1972 officers of Customs and Excise were non-uniformed, the outdoor service, and were responsible for the examination and clearance of cargo (rather than passengers), as well as control of Purchase Tax. When Purchase Tax was replaced by VAT, control of this tax became the responsibility of HM Customs and Excise.

See also
 HM Coastguard
 HM Customs and Excise

References

External links
Report of the Committee on the Customs Waterguard Service and the Customs Watchers
hm-waterguard.org
UK Web Archive of HM Waterguard

Defunct law enforcement agencies of the United Kingdom
History of taxation in the United Kingdom
Customs services
1809 establishments in the United Kingdom
Organizations established in 1809
Organizations disestablished in 1972